The name Ben has been used for three tropical cyclones in the northwest Pacific Ocean.

 Tropical Storm Ben (1979) (T7924, 28W, Krising), struck the Philippines
 Tropical Storm Ben (1983) (T8306, 07W), approached Japan
 Typhoon Ben (1986) (T8617, 14W), Category 4 typhoon; no landfall

Pacific typhoon set index articles